Germany Must Perish! is a 104-page book written by Theodore N. Kaufman, which he self-published in 1941 in the United States. The book advocated genocide through the sterilization of all Germans and the territorial dismemberment of Germany, believing that this would achieve world peace. Kaufman founded the Argyle Press in Newark, New Jersey, United States, in order to publish this book. He was the sole proprietor of the Argyle Press, which is not known to have published any other works.

The Nazi Party used the book, written by a Jewish author, to support their argument that Jews were plotting against their country.

Contents
Kaufman advocated the mass extermination of the German people through forced sterilization and the territorial dismemberment of Germany after an Allied victory in World War II.

Kaufman summarized Germany Must Perish! in advertisements in The New York Times and New York Post as: "A dynamic volume outlining a plan for the extinction of Germany and containing a map showing possible dissection and apportionment of its territory." Kaufman defended his plan for the "sterilization of all Germans" in an interview published in the September 26, 1941, issue of The Canadian Jewish Chronicle:

Reception

In the United States
Although self-published, the book received considerable attention. Time magazine published a review in its 24 March issue that compared the book to Jonathan Swift's 1729 satirical essay A Modest Proposal, which proposed reducing the population pressure in Ireland by the cannibalistic consumption of poor Irish infants. However, the Time essay recognized that Kaufman's work was not satirical; it described the book as the "enshrinement of a single sensational idea". "Since Germans are the perennial disturbers of the world's peace, says the book, they must be dealt with like any homicidal criminals. But it is unnecessary to put the whole German nation to the sword. It is more humane to sterilize them."

According to one study, reviews in the United States "reflected an odd combination of straight reporting and skepticism". Kaufman's second and more moderate pamphlet, "No More German Wars" published in 1942, was ignored in both the U.S. and Germany.

An advertisement in The New York Times stated that the book was released to the public on March 1, 1941. Kaufman also promoted the book by mailing a miniature black cardboard coffin with a hinged lid to reviewers. Inside the coffin was a card proclaiming, "Read GERMANY MUST PERISH! Tomorrow you will receive your copy."

The book's dust jacket contained excerpts from reviews of the book. One blurb read: "A Plan For Permanent Peace Among Civilized Nations! -- New York Times."

Kaufman's book was cited by a prominent Jewish-American trial lawyer, Louis Nizer. In his 1944 book What To Do With Germany, Nizer accepted the collective punishment of Germans and considered, though ultimately rejected, their mass "eugenic sterilization".

In 1945, a Jewish journalist wrote an article claiming that the book was "little more than self-indulgence in dire vituperation by a man who sees Germany as the sole cause of the world's woes".

In Germany
Kaufman was a Manhattan-born Jew and his advocacy of genocide attracted great attention in Germany. The book was denounced in Germany as an "orgy of Jewish hatred", and it was seen as inspired by United States President Franklin D. Roosevelt's supposed polemical anti-German agitation. American journalist Howard K. Smith was in Germany when Germany Must Perish! became known. He wrote:

In September 1941, Julius Streicher published an essay in Der Stürmer that called Kaufman's book "the crazy thinking of [an] insane Jewish brain". He quoted Kaufman at length and then commented: "By destroying the German people, the Jew wants to stop up the spring from which, since the beginning, the world has always found its creative blood, the source of all that is beautiful, good and noble." Joseph Goebbels also gave a radio address from Berlin warning Germans of "plans 'for sterilization of our entire population under 60 years' of age". These concerns were echoed by Adolf Hitler himself after the US entered World War II; he claimed mass sterilization of German male youth was a "primary" American goal.

When the Jews of Hanover were evicted on September 8, 1941, the local authorities cited Kaufman's book as one of the reasons. Kaufman responded:

The book appeared in many pieces of Nazi propaganda. The Parole der Woche weekly wall newspaper included it as evidence that the Allies' war aims included the destruction of Germany. The pamphlet "The War Goal of World Plutocracy" detailed the contents of the book, although with some omissions from the text that it quoted. It was used in 1944 in a pamphlet, "Never!", which described Kaufman's importance:

At his Nuremberg trial, Julius Streicher cited Kaufman's book in his defense, claiming his anger at Jews was prompted by Germany Must Perish!. The German philosopher and historian Ernst Nolte argues that the German reaction to Germany Must Perish! supports his contention that World War II was a genuine response to German fears of a worldwide Jewish plot.

See also
Germania est delenda
Germany is Our Problem
Society for the Prevention of World War III
Your Job in Germany
Morgenthau Plan

References

Further reading

Randall Bytwerk, "The Argument for Genocide in Nazi Propaganda," Quarterly Journal of Speech, 91 (2005), pp. 37–62
Jeffrey Herf, The Jewish Enemy: Nazi Propaganda During World War II and the Holocaust, Harvard University Press, 2006, pp. 110–115

External links

Text
Germany must perish!  Newark, N.J., Argyle Press 1941 (probable first edition)
Germany must perish!  Newark, N.J. : Argyle Press c1941 (apparently the second or later ed. published by Kaufman)

Propaganda
"The War Goal of World Plutocracy" A September 1941 pamphlet by Wolfgang Diewerge
"When you see this symbol..." Cover illustration and excerpts from a November 1941 flyer

1941 non-fiction books
American political books
Anti-German sentiment in the United States
Ethnic cleansing of Germans
Eugenics
Genocide
Sterilization (medicine)
Self-published books
World War II propaganda